Adair County Courthouse is a historic courthouse located at Kirksville, Adair County, Missouri. It was built in 1898, and is a three-story, Richardsonian Romanesque style rectangular building.  It is constructed of rusticated stone, and has a medium composition hipped roof.  It has four gables, four hipped dormers, and features four corner pavilions with pyramidal roofs.  It features large Roman entrance arches supported by pairs of short, thick colonnettes of polished granite.

It was listed on the National Register of Historic Places in 1978.

References

County courthouses in Missouri
Courthouses on the National Register of Historic Places in Missouri
Richardsonian Romanesque architecture in Missouri
Government buildings completed in 1898
Buildings and structures in Adair County, Missouri
National Register of Historic Places in Adair County, Missouri